Alincourt is a commune in the Ardennes department in the Grand Est region of northern France.

The inhabitants of the commune are known as Alincourtois or Alincourtoises

Geography
Alincourt is located some 15 km south of Rethel and 25 km north-east of Rheims. It can be accessed on the D925 road from Neuflize in the west passing through the heart of the commune and the village and continuing east to Juniville. The D985 road from Perthes in the north also passes through the north-west of the commune and continues to join the D925 west of Juniville. The commune consists entirely of farmland other than a strip of forest along the banks of the river.

The Retourne river flows through the commune from east to west passing just south of the village and continuing west until it joins the Aisne at Neufchatel-sur-Aisne.

Neighbouring communes and villages

Administration

List of Successive Mayors

Population

Sites and Monuments

The Church of Saint-Hilaire has the epitaph: "to ... Sir Regnaut Feret living knight and Lord of Alincourt Captain of the Regiment of Maine deceased at Bar-le-Duc buried in the Church of Sainte Macre on 16 July 1697 ... Charged in perpetuity to say a High Mass and a vigil at the hour of his decease ... to buy ornaments for the Alincourt church, the place of burial of his father and ancestors" inscribed on black marble on the right side of the choir. On the left side is ... "Sir Jean Claude de Cugnon, Knight and Lord of Alincourt, Branscourt Sorbon, and Arnicourt was buried in this church on 10 September 1775" ... on black marble.
The Chateau of Alincourt

Picture Gallery

Notable people linked to the commune
Hilaire Flandre (1937-2004), born in Alincourt Mayor of Alincourt, Regional Councillor then Senator for Champagne-Ardenne.

See also
Communes of the Ardennes department

References

External links
Alincourt on the old National Geographic Institute website 
Alincourt on Géoportail, National Geographic Institute (IGN) website 
Alincourt on the 1750 Cassini Map

Communes of Ardennes (department)